The musketoon is a shorter-barrelled version of the musket and served in the roles of a shotgun or carbine. Musketoons could be of the same caliber as the issue musket or of a much larger caliber, 1.0–2.5 inches (25–63 mm). The musketoon is most commonly associated with naval use, and pirates in particular, though they also served in a carbine role with cavalry. Musketoon barrels were often flared at the muzzle, resembling a cannon or blunderbuss.

Description
Musketoons had a brass or iron barrel, and used a wheellock, flintlock or caplock  firing mechanism, like the typical musket of the period. They were fired from the shoulder like the musket, but the shorter length (barrels were as short as a foot (30 cm) long) made them easier to handle for those in restricted conditions, such as mounted infantry and naval boarding parties.

Smaller bore musketoons matched the caliber of the muskets in service, and were generally used the same way, with single musket ball or a buck and ball load, while large bore musketoons were loaded with multiple buckshot or pistol balls (generally smaller in diameter than musket balls) and used as shotguns.  It is this type of loading that is most associated with naval use. Their resemblance to earlier weapons like the blunderbuss has led to their misidentification in both scholarly and popular media.

Service
Due to its smaller size and weight the "Paget carbine" was used through the Napoleonic wars by the British cavalry units. It had a 16 inch smoothbore barrel and could be better wielded from horseback than the standard "Brown Bess" musket or Baker rifle. The British army updated their cavalry carbines in the percussion era, issuing the Enfield pattern of 1858 and the 1861 artillery or cavalry carbines, both with 24 inch rifled barrels. Other European armies also armed their cavalry units with shorter-barreled carbines or musketoons.

Musketoons saw service with the US Army on land as the short length musket-caliber  Springfield Model 1847 Musketoon.  The weapons were issued to antebellum dragoons between the Mexican-American War and the American Civil War and are known to have been used at the Battle of Pine Creek, and by Captain Andrew Jackson Smith's forces near Big Meadows.

See also 

 Arquebus
 Blunderbuss
 Carbine
 Petronel

References

Musketoons in the British National Maritime Museum online collections
Usage information from the British National Maritime Museum

Muskets
19th-century weapons
18th-century weapons